Anděl (masculine) or Andělová (feminine) is a Czech language surname literally meaning "angel".  Notable people with  surname Anděl/Andělová or Andel include:

 (1821-1895), Czech daguerreotyper, lithographer, painter, photographer, graphic artist and miniaturist
 Karel Anděl (1884–1947), Czech astronomer and selenographer
 (1908-1984), Czech anti-Nazi resistance activist and Righteous Among the Nations
 (born 1946), Czech physician and educator
 (born 1950), Czech politician and statesman
Pavel Anděl (born 1964), Czech actor, musician, writer, dramaturge, and television presenter
  (1924-2018), Czech historian and educator
Laura Andel (born 1968), Argentinian musician, conductor and composer of Moldovan descent

See also

Van Andel

Czech-language surnames